Ronald Ray Dunn (born January 24, 1950 in Oklahoma City, Oklahoma) is a former Major League Baseball player. He was primarily used as a pinch hitter, but was also used as a second baseman and third baseman.

Dunn currently resides in San Jose, CA.

External links
, or Retrosheet

1950 births
Living people
Aberdeen Pheasants players
Asheville Orioles players
Baseball players from Oklahoma
Chicago Cubs players
Florida Instructional League Orioles players
Hawaii Islanders players
Miami Marlins (FSL) players
Midland Cubs players
Sportspeople from Oklahoma City
Stockton Ports players
Tigres de Aragua players
American expatriate baseball players in Venezuela
Wichita Aeros players
Winter Haven Super Sox players